In computer programming, machine code is any low-level programming language, consisting of machine language instructions, which are used to control a computer's central processing unit (CPU). Each instruction causes the CPU to perform a very specific task, such as a load, a store, a jump, or an arithmetic logic unit (ALU) operation on one or more units of data in the CPU's registers or memory.

Early CPUs had specific machine code that might break backwards compatibility with each new CPU released. The notion of an instruction set architecture (ISA) defines and specifies the behavior and encoding in memory of the instruction set of the system, without specifying its exact implementation. This acts as an abstraction layer, enabling compatibility within the same family of CPUs, so that machine code written or generated according to the ISA for the family will run on all CPUs in the family, including future CPUs.

In general, each architecture family (e.g. x86, ARM) has its own ISA, and hence its own specific machine code language. There are exceptions, e.g. the IA-64 can emulate x86.

Machine code is a strictly numerical language, and is the lowest-level interface to the CPU intended for a programmer. There is, on some CPUs, a lower level interface in the form of (modifiable) microcode that implement the machine code. However, microcode is not intended to be changed by the end user on normal commercial CPUs. Assembly language provides a direct mapping between the numerical machine code and a human readable version where numerical opcodes and operands are replaced by readable strings (e.g. 0x90 is the NOP instruction on x86). While it is possible to write programs directly in machine code, managing individual bits and calculating numerical addresses and constants manually is tedious and error-prone. For this reason, programs are very rarely written directly in machine code in modern contexts, but may be done for low level debugging, program patching (especially when assembler source is not available) and assembly language disassembly.

The majority of practical programs today are written in higher-level languages or assembly language. The source code is then translated to executable machine code by utilities such as compilers, assemblers, and linkers, with the important exception of interpreted programs, which are not translated into machine code. However, the interpreter itself, which may be seen as an executor or processor performing the instructions of the source code, typically consists of directly executable machine code (generated from assembly or high-level language source code).

Machine code is by definition the lowest level of programming detail visible to the programmer, but internally many processors use microcode or optimise and transform machine code instructions into sequences of micro-ops. This is not generally considered to be a machine code.

Instruction set

Every processor or processor family has its own instruction set. Instructions are patterns of bits, digits, or characters that correspond to machine commands. Thus, the instruction set is specific to a class of processors using (mostly) the same architecture. Successor or derivative processor designs often include instructions of a predecessor and may add new additional instructions. Occasionally, a successor design will discontinue or alter the meaning of some instruction code (typically because it is needed for new purposes), affecting code compatibility to some extent; even compatible processors may show slightly different behavior for some instructions, but this is rarely a problem. Systems may also differ in other details, such as memory arrangement, operating systems, or peripheral devices. Because a program normally relies on such factors, different systems will typically not run the same machine code, even when the same type of processor is used.

A processor's instruction set may have fixed-length or variable-length instructions. How the patterns are organized varies with the particular architecture and type of instruction. Most instructions have one or more opcode fields that specify the basic instruction type (such as arithmetic, logical, jump, etc.), the operation (such as add or compare), and other fields that may give the type of the operand(s), the addressing mode(s), the addressing offset(s) or index, or the operand value itself (such constant operands contained in an instruction are called immediate).

Not all machines or individual instructions have explicit operands. On a machine with a single accumulator, the accumulator is implicitly both the left operand and result of most arithmetic instructions. Some other architectures, such as the x86 architecture, have accumulator versions of common instructions, with the accumulator regarded as one of the general registers by longer instructions. A stack machine has most or all of its operands on an implicit stack. Special purpose instructions also often lack explicit operands; for example, CPUID in the x86 architecture writes values into four implicit destination registers. This distinction between explicit and implicit operands is important in code generators, especially in the register allocation and live range tracking parts. A good code optimizer can track implicit as well as explicit operands which may allow more frequent constant propagation, constant folding of registers (a register assigned the result of a constant expression freed up by replacing it by that constant) and other code enhancements.

Programs
A computer program is a list of instructions that can be executed by a central processing unit (CPU). A program's execution is done in order for the CPU that is executing it to solve a problem and thus accomplish a result. While simple processors are able to execute instructions one after another, superscalar processors are able under certain circumstances (when the pipeline is full) of executing two or more instructions simultaneously. As an example, the original Intel Pentium from 1993 can execute at most two instructions per clock cycle when its pipeline is full.

Program flow may be influenced by special 'jump' instructions that transfer execution to an address (and hence instruction) other than the next numerically sequential address. Whether these conditional jumps occur is dependent upon a condition such as a value being greater than, less than, or equal to another value.

Assembly languages

A much more human friendly rendition of machine language, called assembly language, uses mnemonic codes to refer to machine code instructions, rather than using the instructions' numeric values directly, and uses symbolic names to refer to storage locations and sometimes registers. For example, on the Zilog Z80 processor, the machine code 00000101, which causes the CPU to decrement the B general-purpose register, would be represented in assembly language as DEC B.

Example
The MIPS architecture provides a specific example for a machine code whose instructions are always 32 bits long. The general type of instruction is given by the op (operation) field, the highest 6 bits. J-type (jump) and I-type (immediate) instructions are fully specified by op. R-type (register) instructions include an additional field funct to determine the exact operation. The fields used in these types are:

    6      5     5     5     5      6 bits
 [  op  |  rs |  rt |  rd |shamt| funct]  R-type
 [  op  |  rs |  rt | address/immediate]  I-type
 [  op  |        target address        ]  J-type

rs, rt, and rd indicate register operands; shamt gives a shift amount; and the address or immediate fields contain an operand directly.

For example, adding the registers 1 and 2 and placing the result in register 6 is encoded:

 [  op  |  rs |  rt |  rd |shamt| funct]
     0     1     2     6     0     32     decimal
  000000 00001 00010 00110 00000 100000   binary

Load a value into register 8, taken from the memory cell 68 cells after the location listed in register 3:

 [  op  |  rs |  rt | address/immediate]
    35     3     8           68           decimal
  100011 00011 01000 00000 00001 000100   binary

Jumping to the address 1024:

 [  op  |        target address        ]
     2                 1024               decimal
  000010 00000 00000 00000 10000 000000   binary

Overlapping instructions

On processor architectures with variable-length instruction sets (such as Intel's x86 processor family) it is, within the limits of the control-flow resynchronizing phenomenon known as the Kruskal Count, sometimes possible through opcode-level programming to deliberately arrange the resulting code so that two code paths share a common fragment of opcode sequences. These are called overlapping instructions, overlapping opcodes, overlapping code, overlapped code, instruction scission, or jump into the middle of an instruction, and represent a form of superposition.

In the 1970s and 1980s, overlapping instructions were sometimes used to preserve memory space. One example were in the implementation of error tables in Microsoft's Altair BASIC, where interleaved instructions mutually shared their instruction bytes. The technique is rarely used today, but might still be necessary to resort to in areas where extreme optimization for size is necessary on byte-level such as in the implementation of boot loaders which have to fit into boot sectors.

It is also sometimes used as a code obfuscation technique as a measure against disassembly and tampering.

The principle is also utilized in shared code sequences of fat binaries which must run on multiple instruction-set-incompatible processor platforms.

This property is also used to find unintended instructions called gadgets in existing code repositories and is utilized in return-oriented programming as alternative to code injection for exploits such as return-to-libc attacks.

Relationship to microcode
In some computers, the machine code of the  architecture is implemented by an even more fundamental underlying layer called microcode, providing a common machine language interface across a line or family of different models of computer with widely different underlying dataflows. This is done to facilitate porting of machine language programs between different models. An example of this use is the IBM System/360 family of computers and their successors. With dataflow path widths of 8 bits to 64 bits and beyond, they nevertheless present a common architecture at the machine language level across the entire line.

Using microcode to implement an emulator enables the computer to present the architecture of an entirely different computer. The System/360 line used this to allow porting programs from earlier IBM machines to the new family of computers, e.g. an IBM 1401/1440/1460 emulator on the IBM S/360 model 40.

Relationship to bytecode
Machine code is generally different from bytecode (also known as p-code), which is either executed by an interpreter or itself compiled into machine code for faster (direct) execution. An exception is when a processor is designed to use a particular bytecode directly as its machine code, such as is the case with Java processors.

Machine code and assembly code are sometimes called native code when referring to platform-dependent parts of language features or libraries.

Storing in memory
From the point of view of the CPU, machine code is stored in RAM, but is typically also kept in a set of caches for performance reasons. There may be different caches for instructions and data, depending on the architecture.

The CPU knows what machine code to execute, based on its internal program counter. The program counter points to a memory address and is changed based on special instructions which may cause programmatic branches. The program counter is typically set to a hard coded value when the CPU is first powered on, and will hence execute whatever machine code happens to be at this address.

Similarly, the program counter can be set to execute whatever machine code is at some arbitrary address, even if this isn't valid machine code. This will typically trigger an architecture specific protection fault.

The CPU is oftentimes told, by page permissions in a paging based system, if the current page actually holds machine code by an execute bit — pages have multiple such permission bits (readable, writable, etc.) for various housekeeping functionality. E.g. on Unix-like systems memory pages can be toggled to be executable with the  system call, and on Windows,  can be used to achieve a similar result. If an attempt is made to execute machine code on a non-executable page, an architecture specific fault will typically occur. Treating data as machine code, or finding new ways to use existing machine code, by various techniques, is the basis of some security vulnerabilities.

From the point of view of a process, the code space is the part of its address space where the code in execution is stored. In multitasking systems this comprises the program's code segment and usually shared libraries. In multi-threading environment, different threads of one process share code space along with data space, which reduces the overhead of context switching considerably as compared to process switching.

Readability by humans
Pamela Samuelson wrote that machine code is so unreadable that the United States Copyright Office cannot identify whether a particular encoded program is an original work of authorship; however, the US Copyright Office  allow for copyright registration of computer programs and a program's machine code can sometimes be decompiled in order to make its functioning more easily understandable to humans. However, the output of a decompiler or disassembler will be missing the comments and symbolic references, so while the output may be easier to read than the object code, it will still be more difficult than the original source code. This problem does not exist for object-code formats like SQUOZE, where the source code is included in the file.

Cognitive science professor Douglas Hofstadter has compared machine code to genetic code, saying that "Looking at a program written in machine language is vaguely comparable to looking at a DNA molecule atom by atom."

See also

 Assembly language
 Endianness
 List of machine languages
 Machine code monitor
 Overhead code
 P-code machine
 Reduced instruction set computing (RISC)
 Very long instruction word
 Teaching Machine Code: Micro-Professor MPF-I

Notes

References

Further reading
 
 
 

 

Low-level programming languages